High Profile is a crime novel by Robert B. Parker, the sixth in his Jesse Stone series.

Plot summary
The novel begins with the discovery of a body hanging from a tree in the park.  It doesn't take long to figure out that this is no suicide, as the person had been shot several times before the hanging. After a little investigation the body is discovered to be that of libertarian national talk radio and television personality Walter Weeks. Weeks was an influential man, and personal friend to the governor of Massachusetts, so when the media finds out, Jesse Stone finds himself hounded by the governor and the media, and leading a very high-profile case.

Stone begins his investigation by interviewing Weeks's ex-wives, manager, widow Lorrie Weeks, and bodyguard Conrad Lutz. Before long another twist is added to the crime when the body of Weeks's pregnant mistress turns up in the dumpster of a local restaurant. The medical examination discovers that this second victim was shot by the same gun, probably around the same time. As part of his investigation, Stone has Suitcase Simpson check to see if Weeks has any criminal convictions. The only one that turns up is an incident in Baltimore in 1987 where Weeks was found having sex in his car with a young woman. This seems unimportant at first, until Jesse discovers that the arresting officer was Weeks's bodyguard, Lutz. When questioned, Lutz confirms that he had busted Weeks while working as a Baltimore police officer, but that later he and Weeks then struck up a friendship which ended in Lutz becoming his bodyguard.

The plot thickens when further investigation determines that Lorrie Weeks was formerly Lutz's wife. Stone also learns that Weeks had planned on divorcing Lorrie and leaving his fortune to his new mistress and unborn child. After discovering this, Chief Stone and Suitcase Simpson head up to New York to stake out the widow's apartment. While there they see Lutz visiting her apartment during the day. They also witness Weeks's research assistant Alan Hendricks spending the night. This is interesting to Jesse because Alan was a frequent guest host, and the one writing most of the show's material by the end of Weeks's life. With Hendricks the heir apparent to Weeks's media empire and expected to continue Weeks's shows, it now appears to Jesse that Lorrie is trying to secure herself a new sugar daddy.

With the assistance of an NYPD officer, Chief Stone interrogates Lorrie in her apartment and records the interview. She confirms that she was once married to Lutz. Stone asks her if Lutz could have held onto resentment concerning this and led him to kill Weeks. She seems to ponder it and then confesses that she believes Lutz could be the killer. Back in Paradise, Jesse confronts Lutz with the tape of his ex-wife's accusation, and Lutz leaves the station without a word.

Lutz confesses everything over a glass of Jack Daniels to Jesse that evening in his apartment. He tells Jesse how after he busted Weeks, his wife convinced him to blackmail Weeks into giving him a job as his bodyguard. Later Weeks, a serial womanizer, took a liking to Lorrie. Once again, Lorrie convinced Lutz it would be for the best if they divorced and she married Weeks. Once she got his money, they could get back together and be rich. However, when she found out that he was going to divorce her and leave her with nothing, she convinced Lutz to kill him. So Lutz took Weeks and his mistress for a walk through of their new home on Stiles Island, near Paradise. While there he shoots and kills them both on the beach. He then drags the bodies to the house and stores them in the refrigerator for several days. Finally he hangs Weeks on the tree in the park, and dumps the mistress in the restaurant dumpster. He does this to confuse the police and also to mess up their calculation of the time of death. He was counting on a dumb small town sheriff not knowing what to do, but he got Jesse Stone. He then tells Jesse he is going to leave and will shoot Jesse if he tries to stop him. He pulls his gun on Jesse and Jesse shoots him dead, essentially committing suicide by cop. It was Jesse's revelation that Lorrie was now sleeping with Alan Hendricks and her taped accusation that leads him to do this.

Subplots
A subplot involves Jenn being stalked and raped. She tells Jesse that a man came to her apartment, raped her and was still stalking her. Jesse enlists Sunny Randall's help in finding the stalker. She finds him, but Jenn denies that he is the one that raped her. Later Jesse goes into Jenn's apartment and finds pictures of her with the man. Finally Jesse confronts her about the alleged rape and she confesses that she made it up. She had met the man and he had told her he could help her career so she began sleeping with him. She had admitted earlier to Sunny that that was the reason she hadn't been able to remain faithful to Jesse: she wasn't done sleeping her way to the top. When she realized the man wasn't going to do anything for her career she broke it off with him and told him he was bad in bed. She told Jesse he had raped her in an attempt at getting Jesse back in her life protecting her. Jesse goes to the man's apartment, beats him up, and then tells him if he goes near Jenn again he'll kill him.

Jesse continues his relationship with Sunny throughout the novel, but they break up near the end.

References

Jesse Stone (novel series)
2007 American novels
Novels by Robert B. Parker
Novels about rape
American detective novels